U.S. Route 395 Business may refer to:
U.S. Route 395 Business (Carson City, Nevada), running through downtown Carson City, Nevada
U.S. Route 395 Business (Reno, Nevada), running through Reno, Nevada
U.S. Route 395 Business (Ridgecrest, California), running through Ridgecrest, California

Business
95-3 Business